Mercy Gilbert Medical Center is a full-service, 212-bed, acute care, not-for-profit hospital providing healthcare to the East Valley of the Phoenix Arizona metropolitan area. Services offered include cardiovascular, emergency, family birth center, gastroenterology, pediatric and adolescent, sleep center, orthopedics, and diagnostic services, among others. The hospital is a member of Dignity Health, one of the largest healthcare systems in the west with 40 hospitals in Arizona, California and Nevada.

Milestones

2006:In June, Mercy Gilbert Medical Center opens its doors.

2007-08 :Mercy, along with the other three Arizona Catholic Healthcare West (CHW) hospitals, were voted number one among acute care hospitals. Each was recognized as the best in its respective size category.

2009 In April, Mercy Gilbert Medical Center opened the doors on its second expansion project. The latest phase of the hospital's growth added two operating rooms and 24 beds to the third floor of Tower B. This addition brings the hospital's total bed count to 212, maintaining its status as Gilbert's largest hospital.

Catholic Healthcare West (Now Dignity Health)

While Mercy Gilbert Medical Center has a relatively short history, CHW has a long history. In fact, St. Joseph's Hospital and Medical Center was the first hospital in Arizona. In recent years, CHW has gained international renown for the Barrow Neurological Institute, a leader in treatment of brain and spinal cord diseases and injuries. In the East Valley, Chandler Regional Medical Center  has been open for 50 years. The Mercy Gilbert name honors the Sisters of Mercy, its Sponsoring Congregation. The Sisters of Mercy was founded in the early 1800s in Ireland by Sister Catherine McAuley who had a special love for the virtue of mercy.

Center for Clinical Research

As a member of CHW, Mercy Gilbert Medical Center is supported by the CHW network of 18 internal Institutional Review Boards (IRBs) which provide oversight for nearly 1,000 clinical trials across the system.

References 

Hospital buildings completed in 2006
Hospitals in Arizona